Martyrialized is the second studio album by the Portuguese death metal band Malevolence. This album was recorded at Studio Fredman, and mixed by Fredrik Nordström.

Track listing
 "The Brotherhood of Christ" – 3:19
 "Diabolical Eve (Chronicles of Mother Lusitania)" – 2:52
 "Hunters of the Red Moon" – 3:31
 "Les Salles Obscure De Rose Noire XVIII" – 3:36
 "Thy Extremist Operetta (Instrumental)" – 4:11
 "Insubordination" – 2:37
 "A Shining Onslaught of Tyranny" – 4:02
 "Oceans of Fire" – 3:21
 "Martyrialized" – 3:03

Credits
Carlos Cariano – Rhythm guitar/Vocals 
Fred Nöel – Lead guitar 
Aires Pereira – Bass 
Gustavo Costa – Drums
Paulo Pereira – Keyboards
Fredrik Nordström – Producer

1999 albums
Malevolence (band) albums